Dayton Hollow Dam is a hydroelectric gravity dam on the Otter Tail River in Otter Tail County, Minnesota in the United States. It is located 5 miles southwest of the city of Fergus Falls. Completed in 1909, it is the first power plant built by the Otter Tail Power Company and is one of five dams on the river. Together, they produce about 3.5 megawatts of power.

Shortly after becoming operational, Dayton Hollow Dam narrowly avoided destruction. The city-owned Fergus Falls City Light Station, several miles upstream, abruptly failed in the early hours of September 24, 1909. Three other dams between the disaster site and Dayton Hollow were swept away and a fourth (Central / Wright) was badly damaged. Otter Tail Power Company president Vernon Wright received enough advance warning to reach his dam by 6:15am and open the spillway. The only flood recorded in the history of the river was due to this disaster.

The license for the hydroelectric plant expires on November 30, 2021. In June 2016 the company filed a pre-application with the Federal Energy Regulatory Commission to re-license the station with no changes to existing facilities or operations. The process will take 5 years.

Notes

References

External links 
 Dayton Hollow Hydroelectric Plant

Dams in Minnesota
Buildings and structures in Otter Tail County, Minnesota